Rambha is an asura in Hindu mythology. Rambha and Karambha are asura brothers, born as the descendants of Danu and Kashyapa. When they were young, both decided to perform penance to get special powers to establish the rule of Danavas in the universe.

Penance and boon
Rambha started penance standing inside a burning fire to please Agni Deva, while Karambha stood inside water to please Varuna Deva. When Indra became aware, he decided to kill both brothers. Firstly, Indra assumed the form of a makara and dragged Karambha into the depths, drowning him. However, Agni Deva saved Rambha when Indra tried to kill him. Finally, Rambha got a boon from Agni Deva that he would not be killed by any Deity (Deva), Demon (Danava) or human. Only a dead man could kill him (which was virtually impossible). Rambha became powerful after getting the boon; he began mass killings of human beings and other living beings.

Birth of Mahishasura
Afterward, Rambha saw a water buffalo and fell in love with her, so he changed himself into a water buffalo and started living with her. While the buffalo was pregnant, another male water buffalo became attracted to her. Rambha and the stranger water buffalo had a long fight, finally resulting in Rambha's death. Later, the water buffalo was killed by Rambha's soldiers. The female water buffalo gave birth to a demon, Mahishasura. As he was born of the union of a buffalo and asura, he had the ability to change between human and buffalo form at will.

In another version, Rambha was killed in a battle by Indra, who hurled his vajra (club) at him. As the vajra was made out of the bones of the dead rishi Dadhichi, it killed Rambha.

Rebirth
According to legends, Rambha was reborn as Raktabīja, the army commander of Sumbha and Nisumbha. When Kaushiki was sent to crush the growing power of these two demon brothers, she had to face the stiffest opposition from Raktabīja. He had the boon that if a single drop of his blood falls on the ground, another new Raktabīja would be created, making him almost invincible. Kaushiki then took the form of Kali, and licked off the blood before they touched the ground. Gradually, Raktabīja was defeated and killed.

See also
 Raktabīja
 Chanda and Munda
 Sumbha and Nisumbha
 Mahishasura
 Dhumralochana
 Sugriva (asura)

Reference

External links
 Devī Māhātmya by Swami Sivananda at Divine Life Society

Danavas
Rigvedic deities